The following is a list of winners in the 2009 MYX Music Awards, held at the Meralco Theater, Ortigas Center.

List of nominees and winners

Sarah Geronimo is the big winner with a total of 6 awards.

Winners are in bold text

Favorite MYX Bandarito Performance 
 Astrojuan
 Coffee Break Island
 Delara
 Kinky Hooters
 Nyctinasty

Favorite MYX Live Performance 
 Aiza Seguerra
 Chicosci
 Imago
 Richard Poon
 Sandwich

Favorite International Music Video 
 "7 Things" – Miley Cyrus
 "Crush" – David Archuleta
 "Decode" – Paramore
 "When You Look Me in the Eyes" – Jonas Brothers
 "Womanizer" – Britney Spears

Favorite MYX Celebrity VJ 
 KC Concepcion
 Kim Chiu & Gerald Anderson
 Sam Concepcion
 Sarah Geronimo
 Vhong Navarro

Favorite Media Soundtrack 
 "Ang Sarap Dito" – Project 1 (Coca-Cola)
 "A Very Special Love" – Sarah Geronimo (A Very Special Love)
 "Ikaw Ang Pangarap" – Martin Nievera (Lobo)
 "Kung Fu Fighting" – Sam Concepcion (Kung Fu Panda)
 "This Is Me" – Julianne & Miguel Escueta (Camp Rock)

Favorite Remake 
 "A Very Special Love" – Sarah Geronimo
 "Macho" – Parokya Ni Edgar
 "Message In A Bottle" – The Dawn
 "Payong" – Miss Ganda
 "Princesa" – Itchyworms

Favorite Collaboration 
 "Captured" – Christian Bautista & Sitti
 "This Is Me" – Julianne & Miguel Escueta
 "Egis Erp" – Lourd de Veyra & Raymund Marasigan
 "Ang Sarap Dito" – Project 1
 "I’ll Be There" – Sarah Geronimo & Howie Dorough

Favorite Guest Appearance In A Music Video 
 Bembol Roco ("Boogie Mo" – Bembol Rockers)
 Billy Crawford ("If You’re Not The One" – Nikki Gil)
 Glaiza de Castro ("Disconnection Notice" – Pupil)
 Karylle ("Only Hope" – Gary Valenciano)
 Marian Rivera ("Kung Sakali" – Ogie Alcasid)

Favorite Indie Artist 
 Angulo
 Drip
 Out Of Body Special
 Paraluman
 Reklamo

Favorite New Artist 
 Charice
 KC Concepcion
 Nancy Jane
 Rico Blanco
 Taken by Cars

Favorite Mellow Video 
 "A Very Special Love" – Sarah Geronimo
 "Kung Sakali" – Ogie Alcasid
 "Now" – MYMP
 "Tell Me That You Love Me" – Regine Velasquez
 "The One Who Won My Heart" – Christian Bautista

Favorite Rock Video 
 "Ang Pusa Mo" – Pedicab
 "Disconnection Notice" – Pupil
 "Procrastinator" – Sandwich
 "The Fight Is Over" – Urbandub
 "Yugto" – Rico Blanco

Favorite Urban Video 
 "Eargasmic" – Dice & K9 Mobbstarr
 "K.I.T.T.Y." – Kitty Girls
 "Make ‘Em Say" – Pikaso
 "Pambansang Kamao" – Dcoy feat. Artsrong, E.S.P. & Nathan J.
 "Shake That Thing" – Dannie Boi feat. Beatmox

Favorite Group 
 6cyclemind
 Callalily
 Pupil
 Sandwich
 Sponge Cola

Favorite Male Artist 
 Christian Bautista
 Erik Santos
 Ogie Alcasid
 Richard Poon
 Rico Blanco

Favorite Female Artist 
 Kyla
 Rachelle Ann Go
 Regine Velasquez
 Sarah Geronimo
 Yeng Constantino

Favorite Artist 
 Callalily
 Rico Blanco
 Sandwich
 Sarah Geronimo
 Sponge Cola

Favorite Song 
 "Betamax" – Sandwich
 "Kailan" – Bamboo
 "Pasubali" – Sponge Cola
 "Pitong Araw" – Hale
 "Yugto" – Rico Blanco

Favorite Music Video 
 "Ang Pusa Mo" – Pedicab (Directed by RA Rivera)
 "Ang Sarap Dito" – Project 1 (Directed by Marie Jamora)
 "Disconnection Notice" – Pupil (Directed by Quark Henares)
 "Procrastinator" – Sandwich (Directed by Quark Henares)
 "The Fight Is Over" – Urbandub (Directed by Treb Monteras II

MYX Magna Award 
 Eraserheads

Special Citation Award 
Charice
Arnel Pineda

References

Philippine music awards